Church Broughton is a civil parish in the South Derbyshire district of Derbyshire, England.  The parish contains ten listed buildings that are recorded in the National Heritage List for England.  Of these, one is listed at Grade I, the highest of the three grades, and the others are at Grade II, the lowest grade.  The parish contains the village of Church Broughton, and is otherwise rural.  The listed buildings consist of a church, houses, cottages and associated structures, farmhouses, and farm buildings


Key

Buildings

References

Citations

Sources

 

Lists of listed buildings in Derbyshire